Karaoke Revolution is a video game for the PlayStation 3, Wii and Xbox 360. It is developed by Blitz Games and published by Konami. A different version of the game, Karaoke Revolution Glee was released exclusively for the Wii and is based on the popular musical TV sitcom by 20th Century Fox.

Gameplay
The player is depicted as a character on-screen performing at a public venue. The words to the song scroll right-to-left at the bottom of the screen, above a piano roll representation of the relative pitches at which they are to be sung (the game calls these "note tubes"). At the left end of this area, a "pitch arrow" shows the pitch which the player is singing and provides feedback on whether s/he's hitting the notes. A "crowd meter" shows the mood of the crowd as the player sings; if s/he does a good job of hitting notes on-pitch then the crowd will cheer more loudly and clap in rhythm with the song, and the scene will become more vividly animated. If the crowd meter falls all the way to the lowest rating, the audience will boo the character off-stage and the game is over. New to this iteration of the series is a deep character customization mode, in which players can change facial features, age, ethnicity and weight, along with various clothes and full outfits that comes pre-equipped with some accessories. Also new is a venue customization mode. This allows players to create their own custom stage to sing in, using pyrotechnics, lights, special effects, screens, and more. The game comes pre-packaged with 10 venues, including a Rockabilly theme, a Tiki Torch theme, a Hollywood Glamour theme, and an Outer Space theme. Players can edit these venues, or create their own, with 6 save spaces for custom venues. Also new is the addition of original music videos, which are available for all 50 songs in the track list.
The game comes pre-packaged with a USB Logitech microphone, but it will be compatible with all major gaming mics*, including mics from Rock Band, Guitar Hero, Lips and SingStar.

Soundtrack
The US version of Karaoke Revolution features 50 master tracks (a first for the series), spanning all genres and ranging from classics from the '70s all the way to today's mainstream hits. The UK version features 75 songs. Konami partnered up with Universal Music Enterprises to allow five songs from The Jackson 5 to be featured in the game, along with themes and pictures. Also included are five songs in Spanish on the US version for the first time in the series; the UK version contains songs in French, German, Spanish, Norwegian, and Finnish. The previous downloadable songs from the previous Karaoke Revolution series are also compatible with this version of the series only for the PlayStation 3 and Xbox 360 owners.

 "7 Things" - Miley Cyrus
 "99 Times" - Kate Voegele
 "A Labio Dulce" - Iskander (Spanish song)
 "ABC" - The Jackson 5
 "Addicted to Love" - Robert Palmer
 "Ain't No Stoppin' Us Now" - McFadden & Whitehead
 "American Boy" - Estelle feat. Kanye West
 "Beautiful" - Akon feat. Colby O'Donis
 "Ben" - Michael Jackson
 "Black Horse and the Cherry Tree" - KT Tunstall
 "Burning Down the House" - Talking Heads
 "Crazy" - Seal
 "Da Ya Think I'm Sexy?" - Rod Stewart
 "Dancing Machine" - The Jackson 5
 "Disturbia" - Rihanna
 "Enamorada" - Miranda! (Spanish song)
 "Feels Like Tonight" - Daughtry
 "Gives You Hell" - The All-American Rejects
 "Human" - The Killers
 "I Kissed a Girl" - Katy Perry
 "I Melt with You" - Modern English
 "I Ran (So Far Away)" - A Flock of Seagulls
 "I Want You Back" - The Jackson 5
 "I'll Be There" - The Jackson 5
 "I'm Yours" - Jason Mraz
 "Just Dance" - Lady Gaga feat. Colby O'Donis
 "Love Hurts" - Incubus
 "Love Is a Battlefield" - Pat Benatar
 "Love Story" - Taylor Swift
 "Man On The Moon" - R.E.M.
 "My Life Would Suck Without You" - Kelly Clarkson
 "No Me Doy Por Vencido" - Luis Fonsi (Spanish song)
 "Pocketful of Sunshine" - Natasha Bedingfield
 "Rehab" - Amy Winehouse
 "Ser O Parecer" - RBD (Spanish song)
 "Sex on Fire" - Kings of Leon
 "Shout" - Tears for Fears
 "Si Me Besas" - Lola (Spanish song)
 "Smile" - Lily Allen
 "So What" - Pink
 "Solid" - Ashford & Simpson
 "Soul Meets Body" - Death Cab for Cutie
 "Space Oddity" - David Bowie
 "The Logical Song" - Supertramp
 "This Love" - Maroon 5
 "Viva la Vida" - Coldplay
 "What Have I Done to Deserve This?" - Pet Shop Boys & Dusty Springfield
 "What Hurts the Most" - Rascal Flatts
 "Wicked Game" - Chris Isaak
 "You Found Me" - The Fray

The following songs are exclusive to the UK version of Karaoke Revolution:

 "1000 Miles" - H.E.A.T
 "Adulte et Sexy" - Emmanuel Moire (French song)
 "Assis Par Terre" - Louisy Joseph (French song)
 "Cara Mia" - Måns Zelmerlöw (Swedish song)
 "Common People" - Pulp
 "Dragostea din tei" - O-Zone (Romanian song)
 "Fairytale Gone Bad" - Sunrise Avenue
 "Freed from Desire" - Gala
 "Gold" - Klee
 "Håll om mig" - Nanne (Swedish song)
 "I'm Gonna Be (500 Miles)" - The Proclaimers
 "Ihmisten edessä" - Jenni Vartiainen (Finnish song)
 "In for the Kill" - La Roux
 "It's My Life" - Amy Diamond
 "Jan Pillemann Otze" - Mickie Krause (German song)
 "Kaksi Puuta" - Juha Tapio (Finnish song)
 "L.E.S. Artistes" - Santigold
 "La Bamba" - Los Lobos (Spanish song)
 "La Voix" - Malena Ernman (Swedish song)
 "Manchmal Mochte Ich Schon Mitt Dir" - Peter Wackel (German song)
 "New Shoes" - Paolo Nutini
 "Nur Ein Wort" - Wir sind Helden (German song)
 "On s'attache" - Christophe Maé (French song)
 "Ooh La La" - Goldfrapp
 "Perfekte Welle" - Juli (German song)
 "So Ein Schoner Tag (Fliegerlied)" - Tim Toupet (German song)
 "Sometime Around Midnight" - The Airborne Toxic Event
 "The Sun Always Shines on T.V." - A-ha
 "Viva Colonia" - Höhner (German song)
 "Wake Up" - Sliimy

Downloadable songs
These are the complete finalized list of the downloadable songs and all are still cover versions found from the previous Karaoke Revolution series. The DLC songs "(I've Had) The Time Of My Life" and "You Lost That Lovin' Feelin'" for the Xbox 360 version are not supported with True Duet features. As of 2010, there will no longer be anymore new downloadable songs for both versions of this game.

Reception

The game received "mixed or average reviews" on all platforms according to the review aggregation website Metacritic.

See also
 SingStar
 Rock Band
 Guitar Hero 5
 Karaoke Revolution
 Lips: Number One Hits

References

External links
 Official Website
 

2009 video games
Karaoke video games
Konami games
PlayStation 3 games
Video games developed in the United Kingdom
Wii games
Xbox 360 games
Blitz Games Studios games
Multiplayer and single-player video games